Mieke Jane Fortune (née Gladwin; 4 January 1977 – 18 August 2018) was a former Australian rugby union player. She made her test debut as a Lock for Australia in 1996 against the Black Ferns in Sydney.

Fortune played ten tests for Australia between 1996 and 2002. She played club rugby for the University of Queensland and also represented Queensland. She competed for the Wallaroos at the 1998 and 2002 Rugby World Cup's.

After retiring from rugby, Fortune and her husband, Graham, moved to the Sunshine Coast and started a wholesale production nursery.

On 18 August 2018, Fortune lost her battle with breast cancer, she was honoured with a moment’s silence before the Wallaroos and Black Ferns first match for the O'Reilly Cup. She is survived by her husband and their three children.

References 

1977 births
2018 deaths
Australian female rugby union players
Australia women's international rugby union players